= Arlington Town Square =

- Coordinates: 42°04′57″N 87°58′52″W
- Address: 21 S. Evergreen Avenue; Arlington Heights, Illinois
- Public transit: Pace
- Website: www.arlingtontownsquare.com

Arlington Town Square is a retail and apartment development located in Arlington Heights. Arlington Town Square was developed as part of a significant building boom associated with the redevelopment of Downtown Arlington Heights. It is home to national retail and restaurant chains, along with local, independent business. The center was formerly home to the Arlington Theaters.
